Hickerson is a surname. Notable people with the surname include:

Bryan Hickerson (born 1963), former professional baseball player
Gene Hickerson (1935–2008), former American Football offensive guard
Joe Hickerson (born 1935), noted folk singer and songleader
John D. Hickerson (1898–1989), United States diplomat
Prissy Hickerson (born 1951), Republican politician